The William H. Seward House Museum is a historic house museum at 33 South Street in Auburn, New York.  Built about 1816,  the home of William H. Seward (1801–72), who served as a New York state senator, the governor of New York, a U.S. senator, a presidential candidate, and then Secretary of State under presidents Abraham Lincoln and Andrew Johnson.  The house was declared a National Historic Landmark in 1964, and added to the National Register of Historic Places on October 15, 1966.  It is now maintained by nonprofit organization as a museum dedicated to Seward's legacy.

Description
The Seward House is located south of the center of Auburn, on the west side of South Street opposite Grover Street.  Its core element is a two-story brick structure, with a gabled roof.  To this house William Seward made numerous additions, beginning with a two-story tower and wing at the west end in 1847, to which a porte-cochere and carriage house were added.  In 1866, he added another narrower wing and three-story tower to the south side of the house, and additional separate carriage houses were built further south on the property.

History
The core of the house was built in 1816 by Judge Elijah Miller, Seward's father-in-law.  Much of the actual construction of the house was done by the carpenter John C. Jeffries as well as his apprentice Brigham Young, who later became the leader of the Church of Jesus Christ of Latter-day Saints.  The house remained in the hands of Seward's descendants until 1951, when it was turned over to a nonprofit for conversion to a museum.

Among other notable accomplishments, Seward negotiated the 1867 purchase of Alaska from Russia, which became known as "Seward's Folly". Although he spent many years in Albany and Washington, D.C., he called this house his home from the time of his marriage in 1824 until his death.  The entire house remains furnished with extensive Seward-family collections.

Gallery

See also
List of National Historic Landmarks in New York
National Register of Historic Places listings in Cayuga County, New York

References

External links

Official site: SewardHouse.Org

Houses on the National Register of Historic Places in New York (state)
National Historic Landmarks in New York (state)
Historic house museums in New York (state)
Museums in Cayuga County, New York
Houses on the Underground Railroad
Biographical museums in New York (state)
Houses in Cayuga County, New York
National Register of Historic Places in Cayuga County, New York
Seward family
Houses completed in 1816
Museums established in 1951
1951 establishments in New York (state)
Underground Railroad in New York (state)
Buildings and structures in Auburn, New York